María Arzú García-Granados (born 1976) is a Guatemalan businessperson. Arzú is the third daughter of the former President of Guatemala and mayor of Guatemala City Álvaro Arzú Irigoyen. She is the only member of the Arzú family that maintains a low profile before public opinion.

References

1976 births
People from Guatemala City
Living people
Arzú family